The 2016–17 MOL Liga is a season of the MOL Liga. DVTK Jegesmedvék is the two-time defending champion after defeating MAC Budapest in the 2015-2016 season. A new team, the Serbian based HK Beograd joined the league.

Team information

Regular season

Results

Updated to match(es) played on 5 February 2017. Source: MOL Liga

Statistics

Scoring leaders 
 
List shows the ten best skaters based on the number of points during the regular season. If two or more skaters are tied (i.e. same number of points, goals and played games), all of the tied skaters are shown.

GP = Games played; G = Goals; A = Assists; Pts = Points; +/– = Plus/Minus

Leading goaltenders 

GP = Games played; TOI = Time on ice (minutes); GA = Goals against; Sv% = Save percentage; GAA = Goals against average

Playoffs
.

† Defending champion

Quarterfinals 
The quarterfinals were played between 14 and 26 February 2017 in a best-of-seven mode.

Semifinals 
The quarterfinals were played between 28 February and 12 March 2017 in a best-of-seven mode.

Finals 
The final games were played between 14 March and 28 March 2017 in a best-of-seven mode.

(1) DVTK Jegesmedvék vs. (2) MAC Budapest 

Games in italics indicate games that will only be played if necessary to determine a winner of the series.

Final rankings

References

External links
Hungarian Hockey Association (MJSZ)
Attendance statistics for the 2016/17 season

Ice hockey leagues in Hungary
HUN
MOL